Karfas, is a small town on the island of Chios, Greece. Located 7 kilometers south of Chios (town), Karfas is among the most popular destinations on the Island, attracting high amounts of tourism due to its cosmopolitan beaches, studios, residences, clubs, restaurants, and general nightlife. Karfas is approximately 3 kilometers from Chios Island National Airport.

Region

Karfas is located on the eastern coast just seven kilometers south from Chios Town, and 3 kilometers from the Chios Airport, in the Kambos region. Nearby Karfas, there is a small village called Ayia Ermioni (Άγια Ερμιόνη), which also is a large tourist spot.

Demographics
According to the 2001 census, Karfas had a permanent resident population of 84. Since then, many estimate that the number of residents living in the area have significantly increased. While the residential population is low, during the summer months Karfas attracts thousands of tourists to the area.

Tourism
Karfas is the most popular area that tourists flock to in Chios, due to its cosmopolitan sandy beaches, nightlife, and several other tourist attractions. The alleged peak season for tourism is July–August.

Populated places in Chios